Nikolai Nikolayevich Vorobyov (also Vorobiev) (18 September 1925, Leningrad — July 14, 1995) was a Soviet and Russian mathematician, an expert in the field of abstract algebra, mathematical logic and probability theory, the founder of the Soviet school  of game theory. He is an author of two textbooks, three monographs, a large number of mathematical articles and a number of popular science books. He supervised over 30 kandidat and D.Sc (habilitation) dissertations.

References

1925 births
1995 deaths
Soviet mathematicians
Game theorists
20th-century Russian mathematicians